Canada Far and Wide is a Circle-Vision 360° film attraction for World Showcase at Epcot that started operation on January 17, 2020.

Show summary 
Replacing O Canada!, Canada Far and Wide is a feature with updated sequences, a new musical score by Canadian composer Andrew Lockington, and narration by Canadian actors Catherine O'Hara and Eugene Levy.

References

External links 
 Official site

Amusement rides introduced in 2020
Circle-Vision 360° films
Documentary films about Canada
Walt Disney Parks and Resorts films
Films shot in Canada
World Showcase